The Lovćen Brigade was an armed force in World War II-Montenegro led by Krsto Zrnov Popović and the Greens. The unit was formed in September, 1942 with the approval of the Italian governorate of Montenegro. 

The army was made up of:
I battalion, (based in Čevo, commanded by Dušan Vuković)
II battalion (based in Rijeka Crnojevića, commanded by Đoko Drecun) 
III battalion (based in Brčeli, commanded by Petar Vuleković)
IV battalion (based in Velimlja, commanded by Risto Radović)

Military units and formations of Yugoslavia in World War II
1940s in Montenegro
Military units and formations established in 1942
Collaboration with Fascist Italy